This is a list of all crewed spacecraft types that have flown into space, including sub-orbital flights above 80 km, Space Stations that have been visited by at least one crew, and spacecraft currently planned to operate with crew in the future. It does not contain spacecraft that have only flown un-crewed and have retired from service, even if they were designed for crewed flight, such as Buran, or crewed flights by spacecraft below 80 km. There is some debate concerning the height at which space is reached (the Karman Line), the Fédération Aéronautique Internationale (FAI) recognise 100 km, NASA, and the USAF recognise this as 50 miles (approx 80 km) - this article chooses the latter, to include the widest possible definition.

Since the first crewed spaceflight of Vostok 1 in 1961 there have been 13 types of spacecraft that have made crewed flights into space - nine American, three Russian, and one Chinese.  There are currently five  operational crewed spacecraft, which form the first part of the list below; the eight retired spacecraft types are listed in the next section; and crewed spacecraft currently in development are listed last.  Space Stations are listed beneath each appropriate section, dates of operation reflect when the first and last crews visited, not when they were launched and deorbited.  There are currently two space stations in orbit around Earth, the International Space Station and the Chinese Tiangong space station.

Crewed spacecraft are designed to support human life for the human spaceflight portion of the mission. Spacecraft for human spaceflight must have a human-rating certification as fit for purpose. Crewed spacecraft must have a breathable atmosphere, pressurised (usually between 345 mbar and 1 bar (1 atmosphere)); and be temperature-regulated (usually ). Crewed spacecraft include space capsules, spaceplanes, and space stations.

Comparison

Currently operational crewed spacecraft

Soyuz (1967) 

 Russian three person Earth orbital spacecraft; Early versions were operated by the Soviet Union and later versions by Russia after 1991. As of December 2021, Soyuz has made 147 crewed spaceflights, including two emergency sub-orbital flights, Soyuz 18a and Soyuz MS-10. There have been two accidental spacecraft losses resulting in the deaths of four cosmonauts, Soyuz 1 and Soyuz 11. Soyuz is the only spacecraft to have successfully saved the lives of a crew using the rocket launch escape system, when in 1983 Soyuz T-10-1 exploded on the launchpad. This spacecraft type has flown into space more times than any other spacecraft.

Shenzhou (2003) 

 Chinese three person Earth orbital spacecraft. Shenzhou is China's first crewed spacecraft. On 15 October 2003, Yang Liwei was carried into space by Shenzhou 5 becoming China's first Taikonaut. The spacecraft has gone on to fly crews to China's Tiangong-1 and Tiangong-2 space labs. Since Jun 2021, Shenzhou has been used as the vehicle to send crews to China's new modular Tiangong space station and back. As of June 2022, Shenzhou has made 10 successful crewed spaceflights.

SpaceShipTwo (2018) 

 United States eight person air-launched sub-orbital space plane operated by Virgin Galactic aimed at the space tourism market. Four crewed flights above 80 km as of July 2021. On 31 October 2014 during a test flight, VSS Enterprise, the first SpaceShipTwo craft, broke up in flight and crashed in the Mojave Desert. One pilot was killed. On 13 December 2018, SpaceShipTwo flew to an altitude of 82.7 km which is recognised as space by the FAA, NASA, and the USAF (although not the Fédération Aéronautique Internationale (FAI) This was the first time an American spacecraft had sent astronauts to space since the final Space Shuttle flight in 2011. On 11 July 2021 a fourth test flight was made above 80 km with six crew aboard, including the company owner Richard Branson.

Crew Dragon (2020) 

 United States four person (initially seven) Earth orbital spacecraft designed by SpaceX to transport astronauts to the International Space Station under the NASA Commercial Crew Contract (CCDev). As of April 2022, Crew Dragon has made 7 crewed spaceflights. Crew Dragon is capable of operating beyond Earth orbit. The first crewed flight, Crew Dragon Demo-2, launched on 30 May 2020 and returned to Earth on 2 August 2020. This was the first time an American spacecraft had sent astronauts to orbit since the final Space Shuttle flight in July 2011. The first operational flight of the Crew Dragon launched on 15 November 2020 with SpaceX Crew-1, making it the only reusable orbital crewed spacecraft currently in operation.

New Shepard (2021) 

 United States six person capsule mounted on a reusable vertical launch sub-orbital rocket aimed at the space tourism market. As of June 2022, there have been 19 successful flights since 2015, with 18 successful rocket booster landings, including 5 crewed flights, carrying a total of 14 passengers into space. First crewed test-flight flew on July 20, 2021.

Currently operational space stations

International Space Station (ISS) (2000) 

 Multinational low Earth orbit modular space station. The International Space Station is a joint project among five participating space agencies: NASA, Roscosmos, JAXA, European Space Agency (ESA), and Canadian Space Agency (CSA). Uncrewed initial assembly 1998–2000. Continuously crewed since November 2000. As of June 2022, ISS has been visited by 105 crewed spacecraft (66 Soyuz, 35 Space Shuttle, and 5 Crew Dragon). The ISS is the largest space station yet constructed. Planned to operate until 2028, with a possible extension to 2030.

Tiangong Space Station (2021) 

 Chinese low Earth orbit modular space station. The Tianhe core module was launched on 29 April 2021. The first crewed flight Shenzhou 12 with 3 astronauts arrived at the station in June 2021. The space station has three modules: the Tianhe core module, and two Laboratory Cabin Modules. The Wentian module docked to the station on 24 July 2022, and the Mengtian module docked on 31 October 2022.

Former crewed spacecraft

Vostok (1961–1963) 

 Soviet single-person Earth orbital spacecraft 6 flights. On 12 April 1961 Vostok 1 carried the first human into space, Cosmonaut Yuri Gagarin. On 16 June 1963, Vostok 6 carried the first woman into space, Cosmonaut Valentina Tereshkova.

Mercury (1961–1963) 

 United States single-person Earth orbital spacecraft 6 flights (including 2 sub-orbital). Mercury was the United States first crewed spacecraft. On 5 May 1961 Mercury-Redstone 3 carried the first American, Alan Shepard, into space on a sub-orbital flight. On 20 February 1962, Mercury-Atlas 6 carried the first American, John Glenn, into Earth orbit.

X-15 (1962–1968) 

 United States single seat, air-launched sub-orbital spaceplane; two X-15 flights above the 100 km Kármán line occurred in 1963, an additional 11 flights between 1962 and 1968 reached altitudes between 80–100 km which were recognised as spaceflights by U.S. authorities.

Voskhod (1964–1965) 

 Soviet three person Vostok derivative made 2 flights. On 18 March 1965, Alexei Leonov performed the first spacewalk in history, from Voskhod 2.

Gemini (1965–1966) 

 United States two person Earth orbital spacecraft 10 flights. On 3 June 1965, Ed White made America's first spacewalk, from Gemini 4.

Apollo (1968–1975) 

  United States three person lunar-capable spacecraft. 15 flights; including nine lunar missions (with six lunar landings). It was the Apollo spacecraft that enabled America to win the Space Race. In December 1968, Apollo 8 was the first crewed spacecraft to orbit the Moon. On 21 July 1969, Neil Armstrong, the Commander of Apollo 11, and Buzz Aldrin became the first humans to walk on the Moon. The Apollo Spacecraft comprised:
 The Apollo command and service module (1968–1975), three person Earth and lunar orbital craft 
 The Apollo Lunar Module (1969–1972), two person lunar lander

Space Shuttle (1981–2011) 

 United States eight person Earth orbital spacecraft; first orbit-capable spaceplane; first reusable orbital spacecraft. Largest cargo capacity to orbit. 135 spaceflights were made in five shuttles; Columbia, Challenger, Discovery, Atlantis, and Endeavour, of which two (Challenger and Columbia) were accidentally destroyed resulting in the deaths of 14 astronauts during missions STS-51-L and STS-107.

SpaceShipOne (2004) 

 United States single pilot, air-launched sub-orbital spaceplane; three flights above the Kármán line occurred in 2004.

Former space stations

Salyut (1971–1986) 

 Soviet/Russian low Earth orbit space stations. Salyut 1 (1 crew 1971), Salyut 4 (2 crews 1975), Salyut 6 (6 crews 1977-1981), and Salyut 7 (12 crews 1982-1986). All now de-orbited.

Almaz (1974–1977) 

 Soviet military reconnaissance low Earth orbit space stations. Badged as Salyut 3 (1 crew 1974), and Salyut 5 (2 crews 1976-1977), as disinformation. Both now deorbited.

Skylab (1973–1974) 

 United States low Earth orbit space station. First United States space station. Visited by 3 crews 1973-1974. It deorbited in 1979.

Mir (1986–2000) 

 Soviet/Russian low Earth orbit modular space station. The first modular space station in history. Twenty-eight crews 1986-2000. Mir was visited by 29 Soyuz and 7 Space Shuttle missions. Mir was deorbited in 2001.

Tiangong program (2012–2016) 

 Chinese low Earth orbit space laboratories. Tiangong 1 was China's first space station; launched in 2011, visited by 2 crews 2012-2013, deorbited in 2018. Tiangong 2 was launched in 2016, visited by 1 crew in 2016, deorbited in 2019. Both vehicles were single-module laboratories, precursors to the modular Tiangong space station, which is planned to have modules derived from Tiangong 1 and 2.

Crewed spacecraft in development

Starliner 

 United States five person (initially seven) Earth orbital spacecraft designed to transport astronauts to the International Space Station under the NASA Commercial Crew Program. Following several technical problems on the first uncrewed test flight in December 2019, a second uncrewed test flight launched in May 2022, with the first crewed flight test (CFT) scheduled for no earlier than April 2023.

Orion 

 A spacecraft capable of lunar missions with a crew of four, planned to be used as part of NASA's Artemis program. Consisting of two components – a Crew Module (CM) manufactured by Lockheed Martin, and a European Service Module (ESM) manufactured by Airbus Defence and Space – the spacecraft are designed to support crewed exploration beyond low Earth orbit. Orion is equipped with solar power, an automated docking system, and glass cockpit interfaces modeled after those used in the Boeing 787 Dreamliner, and can support a crew of six in low Earth orbit and a crew of four in lunar orbit, up to 21 days undocked and up to six months docked. A single AJ10 engine provides the spacecraft's primary propulsion, while eight R-4D-11 engines and six pods of custom reaction control system (RCS) engines developed by Airbus provide the spacecraft's secondary propulsion. Although compatible with other launch vehicles, Orion is primarily designed to launch atop the Space Launch System (SLS) rocket. The first mission on that flew a fully configured Orion spacecraft and service module was Artemis 1. This flight, however, was not a manned mission and served the purpose of testing the systems of the spacecraft in the environment it was designed for. The first crewed mission Artemis 2 is planned for 2024 and will slingshot around the Moon. The following crewed Artemis 3 flight is planned for 2025 and will be a lunar landing mission.

Starship 

 Planned to be a fully reusable interplanetary spacecraft capable of carrying 100 passengers or cargo. Primarily designed for Mars missions it is to be capable of landing on all rocky planets or moons in the Solar System except Venus. For Earth launches Starship will need a two-stage configuration with the addition of a powerful first stage booster called Super-Heavy. Flights from all other planetary bodies will not require a first stage booster. Starship will require refuelling in Earth orbit to enable it to reach other Solar System destinations. Uncrewed test flights commenced in 2020 from Boca Chica, Texas. A custom crewed lunar version of Starship—Starship HLS—was selected in 2021 from three companies that developed design proposals for NASA's Human Landing System for NASA's Artemis program, with a view to land one uncrewed mission plus one crewed mission on the Moon no earlier than 2025. SpaceX plans at least five variants of Starship, two of them intended to carry crew: Cargo flights, crewed flights (except HLS), a fuel depot, a tanker version, and HLS.

Gaganyaan 

 A three-person Earth orbital spacecraft intended to be the first crewed spacecraft of the Indian Human Spaceflight Programme. Gaganyaan will be capable of operating at low Earth orbit for up to 7 days. The upgraded version will be equipped with rendezvous and docking capabilities. Its first crewed flight is planned for 2024 and four Indian astronauts have begun flight training in Russia.

New unnamed Chinese spacecraft 

 Chinese replacement for Shenzhou is a six-person lunar capable spacecraft. An uncrewed flight took place on 5 May 2020, with a crewed flight possible by 2025. Initial flights will be to the new Chinese space station, lunar missions are expected in the 2030s.

Dream Chaser 

 United States seven person Earth orbital space plane. An uncrewed cargo version is scheduled to fly in space in 2023, and a crewed version is planned to fly by 2025.

Orel 

 Russian four person lunar-capable spacecraft to enable the retirement of Soyuz. The first crewed flight is planned for 2025.

SpaceShip III 

 American eight person suborbital spaceplane for use in space tourism and tended research flights.

Crewed spacecraft (planned) 

 The Chinese company Space Transportation is developing a winged rocket for suborbital space tourism. As of January 2022, a first flight is planned for 2024.
 Copenhagen Suborbitals Tycho Brahe Micro Spacecraft (MSC) - a non-profit, all volunteer project that aims to launch the first crewed amateur spacecraft into suborbital space. The project is being financed entirely through crowd-funding. If successful, this project will also make Denmark one of the few countries in the world that has a form of independent crewed spaceflight capabilities.
 Dynetics HLS, a planned NASA-contracted Human Landing System to be used on and around the Moon for NASA's Artemis program being developed by Dynetics and Sierra Nevada Corporation (SNC). Was not selected for HLS program.
 Integrated Lander Vehicle - a planned NASA-contracted, Blue Origin lead, Human Landing System to be used on and around the Moon for NASA's Artemis program. Lockheed Martin, Northrop Grumman, and Draper Laboratory are also developing key features of the vehicle. Was not selected for HLS program.
 Pegasus is a Japanese sub-orbital rocket plane currently being developed by PD AeroSpace.
 RSSC - a Russian reusable sub-orbital space complex, currently being developed by a private company KosmoKurs.
 Selena - NPO Aerospace Technologies (НПО «Авиационно-космические технологии»), suborbital space yacht.
 Susie - Smart Upper Stage for Innovative Exploration - a 2022 Arianespace proposal for a fully reusable five person craft for use by ESA for low earth orbit.

Space stations in development 
 Bigelow Commercial Space Station or Space Complex Alpha, proposed private space habitat scheduled for 2021 initial deployment although this is currently on hold as a result of Bigelow temporarily laying off their entire staff due to the COVID-19 pandemic. A Bigelow test module is currently installed on the International Space Station.
 Gateway - A NASA driven, under construction, international crewed space station orbiting the Moon to be assembled by commercial launch vehicles from 2024.
 Russian Orbital Service Station is Russia's planned Next Generation space station, designed and intended to replace the Russian Orbital Segment of the International Space Station.
 Axiom Station is a planned private space station by the company Axiom Space. The initial modules are planned to be launched and docked with the international segment of the ISS before breaking off and forming a new, free-flying space station before the ISS is deorbited in the late 2020s.
 Starlab Space Station is an in-development, private space station being developed by the company Nanoracks in cooperation with Lockheed Martin. This free-flying space station was announced by the company on October 21, 2021, with a planned launch date of 2027.
 Orbital Reef Station is a planned, private space station currently in development by Blue Origin and Sierra Nevada Corporation. This modular space station is being designed for commercial and space tourism missions and uses. Preliminary plans were unveiled on October 25, 2021 with a planned launch in the late 2020s.

Cancelled crewed spacecraft and space stations 
 The X-20 Dyna-Soar was a United States Air Force spaceplane intended to be used for military missions. The program to develop the spaceplane began in 1957 and was canceled in 1963. 
 MOL, crewed space station operated by the United States Armed Forces derived from the NASA's Gemini spacecraft. Cancelled in 1969.
 LK, crewed Lunar lander for the Soviet crewed lunar programs. Several LK landers were flown in space with no crew. Cancelled in 1976 with the rest of the program.
 CSTS, a proposed collaborative effort between the European Space Agency and Roscosmos. Originally designed as an answer to the Orion program of NASA, the project was eventually cancelled and most of the designs were incorporated into Russia's next generation crewed spacecraft: Orel (spacecraft).
 OPSEK was a proposed successor to Russia's involvement in the International Space Station Programme. Cancelled in 2017 by Roscosmos.
 Altair, (also known as the "Lunar Surface Access Module" or "LSAM" for short) was the planned lunar lander compoment of the Constellation Program. It would've been launched on the Ares V cargo launch vehicle and it, alongside an  Earth Departure Stage would've awaited an Orion Spacecraft to launch and rendezvous with the spacecraft before the EDS sends it and Orion to the Moon with a crew of 4 astronauts for a lunar landing mission. Cancelled in 2010 alongside the rest of the Constellation program.

See also 
 Lists of spacecraft
 List of space stations
 Comparison of crewed space vehicles
 Human spaceflight
 List of human spaceflight programs
 List of human spaceflights
1961-1970
1971-1980
1981-1990
1991-2000
2001-2010
2011-2020
2021-present
 List of spaceflight records
 Crewed Mars rover
 Mars to Stay
 Private spaceflight
 Space medicine
 Tourism on the Moon
 Women in space

References

Citations

Sources 

 

Crewed spacecraft